Chiyyaram is a village that lies on the outskirts of Thrissur, Kerala, South India.

The Vijayamatha Church stands as a symbol of unity among the natives which enabled its planning, implementation and construction. Chiyyaram is also known for Hindu temples such as Karamukku Temple. Other temples in Chiyyaram are Ollurkavu Bhagavathi temple, Mudipillavu Krishna temple and Chiyyaram Dhanuvanthari temple. Hindus and Christians make up a large portion of Chiyyaram's population.

See also
Thrissur
Thrissur District

External links
 Chiyyaram Map

Suburbs of Thrissur city